Keweenaw Bay Ojibwa Community College (KBOCC) is a public tribal community college in Baraga, Michigan.

History
KBOCC was chartered by the Keweenaw Bay Indian Community on July 12, 1975. The Keweenaw Bay Ojibwa Community founded the College with the understanding that American Indian students, as members of sovereign nations, deserved an educational system responsive to their needs and concerns. On November 1, 2017, KBOCC purchased the former Pelkie Elementary School for $1 for use as an education center for the community. On January 26, 2018, Debra Parrish retired after serving nearly 30 years as president. She was succeeded by Lori Ann Sherman.

Traditions
Traditional leaders provide direction to faculty and staff for incorporating the Ojibwa language and culture into each of the KBOCC programs. The student services program offers opportunities for students to engage in traditional ceremonies and events.

Academics
The college is accredited by the Higher Learning Commission.

KBOCC offers Associate of Arts, Science, and Applied Science degrees.

The Bureau of Indian Education, Bureau of Indian Affairs, conducted a site visit in April 2010 and recommended the college for approval as a Tribally Controlled Community College/University under the Act. The U.S. Department of Education approved the KBOCC application for Title IV federal student aid programs.

KBOCC is a member of the American Indian Higher Education Consortium (AIHEC), which is a community of tribally  and federally chartered institutions. KBOCC was created in response to the higher education needs of American Indians. KBOCC generally serves geographically isolated populations that have no other means accessing education beyond the high school level.

References

External links
 Official website

American Indian Higher Education Consortium
Educational institutions established in 1975
Community colleges in Michigan
1975 establishments in Michigan